Mikaele Seo (born 27 December 1971) is a Wallisian politician and member of the Territorial Assembly of Wallis and Futuna. Since 2022 he has represented Wallis and Futuna in the French National Assembly.

Before entering politics Seo worked as a cleaner in a college in Wallis.

Seo was elected to the Territorial Assembly in the 2017 Wallis and Futuna Territorial Assembly election, representing the Mua District. He was appointed chair of the Assembly's standing committee. He was re-elected in the 2022 elections.

Seo served as the alternate for Sylvain Brial and took over his seat in the National Assembly after his stroke. He stood for Brial's seat in the National Assembly in the 2022 French legislative election, and was elected in the second round with 50.11% of the vote. He intends to sit with the president's party, Renaissance, in the Assembly.

References 

1971 births
Living people
21st-century French politicians
Members of the Territorial Assembly of Wallis and Futuna
Deputies of the 16th National Assembly of the French Fifth Republic
Members of Parliament for Wallis and Futuna
La République En Marche! politicians
Politicians from Paris